North Maleny is a rural locality in the Sunshine Coast Region, Queensland, Australia. In the  North Maleny had a population of 621 people.

Geography 
The Baroon Pocket Dam is in the north-east of the locality; it impounds Obi Obi Creek creating Lake Baroon.

History 

The Maleny Provisional School opened on 22 July 1897, becoming Maleny State School on 1 January 1909. It was renamed Maleny North State School in 1913 (probably because of the opening on Maleny Township State School in nearby Maleny) but closed in 1914. On 27 February 1922 it reopened as Maleny North Provisional School, becoming Maleny North State School on 4 July 1927. It finally closed in 1953.

The Baroon Pocket Dam was officially opened by Queensland Premier Mike Ahern on 28 July 1989.

In the  North Maleny had a population of 621 people.

Attractions 
Lake Baroon is an important recreation area for the Sunshine Coast hinterland. There is a sailing club, naval cadet unit, fishing club, accommodation and picnic facilities.

References

Further reading 

  — includes Maleny North State School

External links 

Suburbs of the Sunshine Coast Region
Localities in Queensland